Gideon Mark Henderson FRS (born 29 July 1968) is a British geochemist whose research focuses on low-temperature geochemistry, the carbon cycle, the oceans, and on understanding the mechanisms driving climate change. 
Henderson is presently the Chief Scientific Advisor and Director General for Science and Analysis at the UK Department for Environment, Food, and Rural Affairs.

Education
Schooled at Altwood Comprehensive, Maidenhead.  Henderson graduated in earth sciences from Hertford College, Oxford. He next went to St John's College, Cambridge, to complete a Ph.D. supervised by Professor Sir Keith O'Nions (1990–1994).

Career

After a brief stint at the journal Nature, Henderson was a postdoctoral fellow (1994–1996) and then associate research scientist (1996–1998) at the Lamont–Doherty Earth Observatory of Columbia University.  There he worked with Wally Broecker, Bob Anderson, and independently.  In 1999 he returned to the UK to take up a university lectureship at the Department of Earth Sciences of the University of Oxford, where he has remained as a professor (since 2006) and head of department (from 2013 to 2017).  He is a senior research fellow at University College, Oxford, and an Oxford Martin Expert at the Oxford Martin School.  In 2019 he took up the position of chief scientific advisor to the UK government department responsible for the environment and agriculture – Defra.

Research

Henderson's research relies on the application of trace element and isotope variations in nature to understand processes in the surface-Earth system, particularly in ocean, climate, and carbon systems.  His work makes extensive use of the isotopes created by decay of natural uranium (the U-series decay chain) to assess the rates and timing of environmental processes.  He has also been a pioneer in the use of novel isotope systems, particularly lithium, calcium, cadmium, and barium isotopes.

Past climate
Henderson's work uses the record of past climate captured by the chemistry of sediments and stalagmites to understand processes in the climate system that are hard to understand from present climate alone.  Particular advances have been his use of precise marine chronology to help understand the mechanisms of ice-age deglaciation and sea-level change; the chemistry of stalagmites to quantify the response of Asian monsoon rainfall to climate change; and the growth of stalagmites to understand the sensitivity of Siberian permafrost to warming and the presence of sea-ice.

Marine
With Bob Anderson, Henderson chaired the planning group (2004–2006) and subsequent scientific steering committee (2007- 2012) that initiated the international marine chemistry programme, GEOTRACES.  He led the group that wrote the 2017 Royal Society report, "Future Ocean Resources".  His own oceanic research includes the use of U-series isotopes to assess the rates of important marine processes.

Greenhouse gas removal
Henderson was a founding director (2010–2013) of the Oxford Geoengineering programme, and a member of the steering committee for the NERC Public Dialogue on Geoengineering.  In 2017 he chaired the group that wrote the Royal Society and Royal Academy of Engineering report, “Greenhouse Gas Removal”.  His direct research in this area includes the role of weathering, ocean biology, and the inorganic chemistry of the oceans in removing  from the atmosphere.

Awards
Awards include European Union of Geosciences outstanding young scientist award (2001), the Philip Leverhulme Prize (2001), the Wollaston Fund of the Geological Society of London (2006), and the Plymouth Marine Science Medal (2016)

In 2013 he was elected a Fellow of the Royal Society (FRS), his nomination read:

References 

Fellows of University College, Oxford
Fellows of the Royal Society
1968 births
Living people
British geochemists
Alumni of St John's College, Cambridge
Alumni of Hertford College, Oxford